James May (born 17 June 1981) is a British former professional tennis player.

Biography
May grew up in Kent and attended Dartford Grammar School. He studied sports science at Loughborough University, graduating in 2004. During his time at Loughborough he represented Great Britain at the 2003 Summer Universiade in Daegu and won a gold medal in the men's doubles with Iain Bates.

On the professional tour he reached as high as 242 in the world in doubles. He made two main draw appearances at Wimbledon, as a qualifier in 2006 and wildcard in 2007, both times partnering Neil Bamford.

References

External links
 
 

1981 births
Living people
British male tennis players
Tennis people from Kent
Alumni of Loughborough University
Universiade medalists in tennis
English male tennis players
Universiade gold medalists for Great Britain
Medalists at the 2003 Summer Universiade
Place of birth missing (living people)